Landkreis Kreuzburg O.S. was a Prussian district in Silesia, from 1742 to 1945, with its capital at Kreuzburg O.S. Today, the region is part of the Polish Opole Voivodeship.

History 
In the course of the Stein-Hardenberg Reforms, the district of Kreuzburg in the Province of Silesia was initially assigned to Regierungsbezirk Breslau, but then on May 1, 1820, it was reclassified to Regierungsbezirk Oppeln. Since then, the district has been considered part of Upper Silesia. The district capital was changed to Konstadt, but was moved back to Kreuzburg on January 1, 1880. The spelling of the name of the city and the district fluctuated between Creutzburg, Creuzburg and Kreuzburg. The city and district name was officially set to Kreuzburg in Oberschlesien on September 23, 1881. Later, the abbreviation Kreuzburg OS was adopted.

On November 8, 1919, the Province of Silesia was divided into the Province of Lower Silesia (Regierungsbezirke Liegnitz and Breslau) and the Province of Upper Silesia (Regierungsbezirk Oppeln). On April 1, 1938, the Prussian provinces of Lower Silesia and Upper Silesia were merged to form the new Province of Silesia. On January 18, 1941, the province of Silesia was dissolved again and the Kreuzburg district became part of the newly formed Province of Upper Silesia. During World War II, the Red Army captured the district at the end of January 1945 and it was placed under Polish administration in March.

Demographics 
The district had a mixed population of Germans and Poles. According to religion, the majority of the district population was Protestant, along with sizable minorities of Catholics and Jews.

Place Names 
In 1935/36, several parishes were renamed in the Kreuzburg OS district:

 Alt Tschapel → Stobertal
 Borek → Waldungen
 Bresinke → Birkdorf
 Brinitze → Kiefernhain
 Deutsch Würbitz → Niederweiden OS
 Frei Tschapel → Freivorwerk
 Golkowitz → Alteichen
 Jaschkowitz → Auenfelde
 Lowkowitz → Bienendorf
 Polanowitz → Kornfelde
 Polnisch Würbitz → Würbitz → Oberweiden OS
 Proschlitz → Angersdorf
 Roschkowitz → Röstfelde
 Schiroslawitz → Grenzfelde
 Woislawitz → Kirchlinden

References 

Kreuzburg O.S.
Kluczbork County
1742 establishments in Prussia
1945 disestablishments in Germany
1945 disestablishments in Poland
1940s disestablishments in Prussia